Transplant is a Canadian medical drama television series created by Joseph Kay, which premiered on February 26, 2020, on CTV. The series centres on Bashir "Bash" Hamed, a doctor from Syria who comes to Canada as a refugee during the Syrian Civil War, and is rebuilding his career as a medical resident in the emergency department at the fictional York Memorial Hospital in Toronto.

In June 2020, the series was renewed for a second season, which premiered on January 2, 2022, on CTV, then March 6 on NBC.

In February 2022, the series was renewed for a third season by CTV and NBC. Season 3 premiered on September 23, 2022. Etalk, a company owned by CTV, said that season three will have 13 one-hour episodes, and will air in fall 2022 and winter 2023.

Premise
Transplant follows Dr. Bashir "Bash" Hamed, a Syrian Civil War refugee and a newest resident at York Memorial Hospital, as he navigates through numerous obstacles to resume a career in the high stakes world of emergency medicine.

Cast and characters
 Hamza Haq as Dr. Bashir "Bash" Hamed, a resident at York Memorial Hospital. Due to issues around recognition of foreign credentials, he was unable to get a job with a hospital in the pilot, and instead works as a line cook at a Middle Eastern restaurant; however, he soon has an opportunity to prove his mettle when a serious accident occurs at the restaurant, and his training and experience in a war zone enables him to save lives, using emergency medical techniques that can be performed without conventional medical equipment, before the first responders arrive.
 Laurence Leboeuf as Dr. Magalie "Mags" Leblanc, a driven resident with health and personal issues which she is struggling to stay on top of in the high-stress environment of a hospital emergency room.
 John Hannah as Dr. Jedediah "Jed" Bishop (seasons 1–2), the gruff but compassionate head of the emergency department at York Memorial.
 Ayisha Issa as Dr. June Curtis, a gifted resident trauma surgeon who is emotionally guarded and struggles to open up; in the second season, she applies for and wins the job of chief resident.
 Jim Watson as Dr. Theo Hunter, a pediatric resident from Sudbury who struggles with having to be away from his wife and kids while he completes his residency.
 Sirena Gulamgaus as Amira Hamed, Bash's twelve-year-old sister.
 Torri Higginson as Claire Malone, the head emergency nurse, later nurse practitioner, who is also in a romantic relationship with Jed.
 Grace Lynn Kung as Vivian Barnes (season 1), the hospital's social worker.
 Sugith Varughese as Dr. Aajay Singh, a surgical attending.
 Linda E. Smith as Dr. Wendy Atwater (seasons 1–2), the attending physician who is the residents' immediate supervisor.
 Kenny Wong as Arnold De Luca, an emergency nurse.
 Mariah Inger as Rhoda DaSilva, an emergency nurse.
 Eddie G. as Lou, a security guard at the hospital.
 Eli Shankji as Saleh, Bashir's friend, a Syrian refugee working with Doctors Without Borders in Lebanon.
 Fayçal Azzouz as Khaled, Bashir's friend, a Libyan refugee claimant in Canada.
 Gord Rand as Dr. Mark Novak (season 2–present), the acting head of the emergency department at York Memorial following Jed's stroke.
 Nora Guerch as Rania (season 2–present), an old friend of Bash's from Syria whom he had believed for several years to be dead.
 Atticus Mitchell as Jake Cooper (season 2), a medical student supervised by Theo.
 Rekha Sharma as Dr. Neeta Devi (season 3), Bishop's replacement as York Memorial's emergency department.

Episodes

Series overview

Season 1 (2020)
Note: Premiere date in table reflects CTV premiere date.

Season 2 (2022)

Season 3 (2022-23)

Production
Produced by Sphère Média Plus, the series entered production in June 2019.

The series is primarily filmed in Montreal, with some limited location shooting in Toronto for establishing shots and other scenes which require a clear Toronto geographic marker.

Production on the second season was delayed by the COVID-19 pandemic in Canada, but commenced in February 2021.

International broadcast
In May 2020, NBC acquired the U.S. broadcast rights for the series; it premiered on September 1, 2020, filling a timeslot usually held by its own medical drama New Amsterdam (whose next season was postponed due to the COVID-19 pandemic). On December 11, 2020, NBC picked up the second season of the series for broadcast which premiered on March 6, 2022.

In New Zealand, the series is available for streaming on TVNZ OnDemand. In French Canada, the series airs on Vrak, simultaneously with its broadcast on CTV, and later on Noovo.

In November 2020, Sky Witness acquired the UK rights to the drama after striking a deal with international distributor NBC Universal Global Distribution.

In Brazil, the series is available for streaming on Globoplay.

In Malaysia, the series aired on PRIMEtime.

Reception

Critical response
John Doyle of The Globe and Mail wrote that the show's positioning of Bash as an immigrant struggling for acceptance in his adopted country set the show apart from other medical dramas: "The plot device that kick-starts the series—and Episode 1 sure comes with a kick—might seem ludicrous, but it gets your attention and signals what themes in Transplant are about to blossom. It's about the terror and frustrations that immigrants experience, trying to use their skills in a new country. Much is made of Bashir's knowledge and knowhow being heightened by his experience working in a war zone with few resources. He can intuit medical problems and injuries faster than most of his colleagues. This does not, however, make him either distinctly heroic or arrogant. Given his situation, he's actually an extremely vulnerable man. He's not the irascible Dr. House, nor is he the spookily wise young virtuoso at the heart of The Good Doctor." He praised the series and Haq's lead performance in particular, ultimately concluding that "There are numerous medical dramas that move with a breathless, hectic pace and then stop for some romance or heart-warming moments. Transplant has some of that, but there is an astutely Canadian spin on the familiar. It gives grim articulation to the issues of immigration and the harried, under pressure immigrant experience. It's not entirely original, but certainly superior to the usual and disarmingly different."

In his year-end review of television in 2020, Doyle named Haq and Leboeuf as having given two of the year's best performances in Canadian television.

For etalk, Christine Estima also favourably reviewed many aspects of the show, giving special praise to its choice to avoid positioning its two female doctors, June and Magalie, as competitive rivals, instead presenting them simply as doctors who respect and support each other even if they don't always agree.

In advance of the show's American premiere, John Anderson of The Wall Street Journal reviewed it positively, calling it the best medical show currently airing on American television and potentially one of the better dramas ever aired by NBC in its history. The Hollywood Reporter observed that it was "not a hugely innovative or adventurous medical drama" and had a "heavy reliance on that House trope of a loved one bringing in a patient, only to have the loved one be the one with the actual medical mystery", but that Hamed was "an interesting main character" and Haq was a "solid leading man, giving Bashir a frazzled soulfulness, but never making him saintly". In conclusion, it was felt that "in a fall in which the broadcast drama slate is populated mostly by mediocre acquisitions and dismal holdovers from last midseason, there's value to an above average new show like Transplant."

The industry trade magazine Playback named Haq as Canadian television's breakout star of 2020.

Awards and nominations

Explanatory notes

References

External links

2020 Canadian television series debuts
2020s Canadian medical television series
2020s Canadian drama television series
CTV Television Network original programming
Gemini and Canadian Screen Award for Best Drama Series winners
Refugees and displaced people in fiction
Television shows set in Toronto
Television shows filmed in Montreal
Television series about immigration in Canada
Television series by Bell Media
Television series by Universal Television